Josh Quong Tart (born 18 September 1975 in Sydney) is an Australian actor.

Early life
Tart attended the McDonald College before he was accepted into National Institute of Dramatic Art (NIDA) in 1994, graduating in 1997 with a bachelor's degree in Performing Arts. He is a descendant of prominent Chinese Australian Mei Quong Tart, who ran a popular tea house in the Queen Victoria Building in Sydney, and was also an early Chinese ambassador to Australia. He is the youngest of four boys in his family.

Career
Tart's list of television credits includes the role of Will Monk on headLand, a drama series airing on the Seven Network and Matt Horner on the Australian award-winning series All Saints. Josh was also an original co-host on the kids TV show Sarvo with Jamie Croft on Foxtel's  Nickelodeon.

Quong Tart featured alongside actress Genevieve Lemon and brother Byron Tart in the stage show, Lemon Tart in 2006 and 2007. Tart joined the cast of Home and Away in 2007 as Miles "Milco" Copeland. In October 2011, Tart announced he was departing Home and Away after nearly four years.

In 2012, Tart joined the cast of Underbelly: Badness as Andrew Perish.

In August 2013, it was announced that Tart would play Scar in the 2013–16 Australian production of Disney's The Lion King (nicknamed the Antelope Tour), premiering in Sydney at The Capitol Theatre in December 2013. The show also played in Melbourne, Brisbane and Perth and closed in January 2016.

Tart starred in Betty Blokk-Buster Reimagined during the 2020 Sydney Festival. Sydney Morning Herald critic, Harriet Cunningham, called his performance "simply extraordinary" and "a revelation".

Filmography

References

External links

Josh Quong Tart's profile at homeandaway.com.au

1975 births
Australian male film actors
Australian male stage actors
Australian people of English descent
Male actors from Sydney
Living people
Australian people of Chinese descent
People from the Australian Capital Territory